George Keck may refer to:
 George Fred Keck, American architect
 George Anthony Legh Keck, British MP